Adidovce is a village and municipality in Humenné District in the Prešov Region of north-east Slovakia. The mayor is Milan Koromház (Smer - SD).

History
In historical records the village was first mentioned in 1568.

Geography

Population
On 31 December 2011, it had a population of 202 people.

Genealogical resources
The records for genealogical research are available at the state archive "Statny Archiv in Presov, Slovakia"

 Roman Catholic church records (births/marriages/deaths): 1792-1895
 Greek Catholic church records (births/marriages/deaths): 1819-1946
 Census records 1869 of Adidovce are available at the state archive.

See also
 List of municipalities and towns in Slovakia

References

External links
 
 https://web.archive.org/web/20070513023228/http://www.statistics.sk/mosmis/eng/run.html
 Surnames of living people in Adidovce

Villages and municipalities in Humenné District
Zemplín (region)